The 2016 Baltimore mayoral election was held November 8, 2016 concurrent with the General Election. Stephanie Rawlings-Blake, the incumbent mayor, did not run for reelection. Catherine Pugh won the election on November 8, 2016, with 57% of the popular vote, and took office on December 6, 2016.

Background and candidates

Incumbent Mayor Stephanie Rawlings-Blake did not seek re-election in 2016. She completed former Mayor Dixon's term, and won the mayoral seat in the 2011 mayoral race. After holding the office for five years, she faced challenges and criticism during her tenure. Notable events include the 2015 Freddie Gray Protests, Governor Hogan's rejection of the Baltimore Red Line, and an increase in crime since the Freddie Gray Protests in April 2015.

On July 1, 2015, Sheila Dixon entered the 2016 mayoral race. (The terms of Dixon's probation prevented her from running for office until after December 2012.) Since her announcement, Dixon has campaigned in West Baltimore about the city's increasing transportation issues. Additional candidates include Baltimore City Council members Nick Mosby and Carl Stokes, Baltimore Police Sergeant Gersham Cupid, writer Mack Clifton, engineer Calvin Young, Baltimore Sun op-ed contributor Connor Meek, attorney and public servant Elizabeth Embry, and Black Lives Matter activist DeRay Mckesson.

On September 11, 2015, Rawlings-Blake announced that she would not seek re-election as mayor, stating, "It was a very difficult decision, but I knew I needed to spend time focused on the city's future, not my own".

Democratic primary

The Democratic mayoral primary was held on April 26, 2016. Catherine Pugh won the Democratic primary running against former Mayor Sheila Dixon and 11 other challengers in a crowded field to replace Mayor Stephanie Rawlings-Blake.

Declared

 Mack Clifton, writer
 Gersham Cupid, Baltimore police sergeant
 Sheila Dixon, former Mayor of Baltimore
 Elizabeth Embry, attorney and public servant
 Patrick Gutierrez, former bank operations manager
 Mike Maraziti, business owner
 DeRay Mckesson, civil rights activist and former school teacher/administrator
 Connor Meek, Baltimore Sun op-ed contributor
 Nick Mosby, Baltimore City Council member for the 7th district (dropped out)
 Catherine Pugh, State Senator for the 40th district and former Baltimore City Council member for the 4th district
 Carl Stokes, Baltimore City Council member for the 12th district
 Cindy Walsh, former UPS manager and candidate for Governor of Maryland in the 2014 gubernatorial election
 David Warnock, businessman
 Wilton Wilson, nurse
 Calvin Young, engineer

Declined
 Stephanie Rawlings-Blake, incumbent Mayor of Baltimore

Republican primary
Declared
 Armand Girard, retired math teacher
 Chancellor Torbit
 Brian Charles Vaeth, perennial candidate
Alan Walden, retired WBAL radio personality
 Larry Wardlow

Green Party primary
Declared
 Joshua Harris, community activist, co-founder of Hollins Creative Placemaking
 David Marriott, US Marine
 Emanuel McCray, Army Veteran

Write-in candidates
Former Mayor of Baltimore Sheila Dixon, who lost in the Democratic primary, re-entered the race as a write-in candidate and came in second to Pugh with 22% of the popular vote. Democratic candidate Mack Clifton, who also lost in the primaries, re-entered as a write-in candidate. In addition, Republican Steven H. Smith, Independent Frank Logan, and unaffiliated candidates Sarah Klauda and Lavern Murray, who did not run in the primaries, joined the race as write-in candidates.

Results

References

External links
 Alan Walden for Mayor (R)
 Catherine Pugh for Mayor (D)
 Joshua Harris for Mayor (G)

Baltimore
November 2016 events in the United States
Mayoral elections in Baltimore
Baltimore mayoral